Xerotricha corderoi is a species of small air-breathing land snail, a terrestrial pulmonate gastropod mollusk in the family Geomitridae.

Distribution

It is endemic to mountain ranges from the Asturias and León provinces, in the north of Spain.

References

 Gittenberger, E. & Manga, M. Y. (1977). Some new species of the genus Helicella (Pulmonata, Helicidae) from the province León, Spain. Zoologische Mededelingen. 51 (11): 177-189, pl. 1-2. Leiden
 Bank, R. A.; Neubert, E. (2017). Checklist of the land and freshwater Gastropoda of Europe. Last update: July 16th, 2017

External links
 AnimalBase info

Geomitridae
Gastropods described in 1977